Medalla is a Spanish word meaning medal. It may also refer to:

 Medalla Light, a Puerto Rican beer produced by Cervecera de Puerto Rico
 David Medalla (born 1942), Filipino international artist
 Felipe Medalla, Filipino economist